Basuki is a personal name meaning "the safe person" in Javanese.

Basuki may refer to:
 Basuki (comedian)
 Basuki Abdullah, artist and painter
 Basuki Rahmat, Minister of Home Affairs of Indonesia (1966–1969)
 Basuki Tjahaja Purnama, former Governor of DKI Jakarta (2014–2017) and Deputy Governor of DKI Jakarta (2012–2014)
 Basuki Hadimuljono, Indonesian Ministers of Public Works and Public Housing (2014–2019)

See also